Martin A. Furgol (January 5, 1916 – November 23, 2005) was an American professional golfer. He won five times on the PGA Tour in the 1950s. He played on the 1955 Ryder Cup team.  He was born in New York Mills, New York and died in Florida. Although he was from the same town as golfer Ed Furgol, they are not related.

Professional wins (6)

PGA Tour wins (5)

PGA Tour playoff record (0–1)

Other wins (1)
this list may be incomplete
1970 Philadelphia PGA Championship

U.S. national team appearances
Ryder Cup: 1955 (winners)
Hopkins Trophy: 1954 (winners), 1955 (winners)
Lakes International Cup: 1954 (winners)

See also
List of golfers with most PGA Tour wins

References

External links

American male golfers
PGA Tour golfers
PGA Tour Champions golfers
Ryder Cup competitors for the United States
Golfers from New York (state)
People from New York Mills, New York
1916 births
2005 deaths